"Soldado De Papel" is the third promotional single to be released from David Bisbal's 2006 studio album, Premonición. The single features Spanish singer Tomatito.

Song information

The single isn't made for radio station, only for TV promotional.  

In "Soldado de Papel", David Bisbal denounces using minors in armed conflicts. Deeply moved by this human rights violation, Bisbal composed months behind this song included in his new album Premonición. The money generated by Bisbal's copyright of "Soldado De Papel" will be donated to the Spanish Coalition to finish with the Utilization of Children and Girls Soldiers and will be destined to support the work of denunciation, to actions of sensitization and to rehabilitation programs in countries in conflict.

David Bisbal songs
Spanish-language songs